The saury (Cololabis adocetus) is a species of fish (not to be confused with the Pacific saury, another species in the genus Cololabis) which is a member of the family Scomberesocidae, or the saury family. It is widespread in the Eastern Pacific in the surface waters, typically remaining in the top 50 centimeters of the water column - although it can be found at depths of up to 1 meter. It can grow to a length of about 5 centimeters. The saury generally lives in waters between 5 and 12 degrees Celsius. The saury is a highly migratory fish.

See also
 Pacific saury

References

External links 
 

Cololabis
Commercial fish
Fish of the Pacific Ocean
Fish described in 1951